Air Chief Marshal Sir Michael William Patrick Knight,  (23 November 1932 – 28 November 2022) was a British Royal Air Force commander who was well known for his various charity projects, especially for the "Vulcan to the Sky" cause.

Early life
Knight was born on 23 November 1932 in Leek, Staffordshire. He was educated at Leek High School, then studied English Language at the University of Liverpool, where he joined the University Air Squadron. After his graduation, he began his National Service and finished his training as a pilot.

RAF career
Knight joined the Royal Air Force in 1953. He was appointed Air Officer Commanding No. 1 Group in 1980, Air Member for Supply and Organisation in 1983 and UK Military Representative to NATO in 1986. He retired in 1989. As of 2009, he was still actively involved in "Vulcan to the Sky", a project that returned a vintage Avro Vulcan XH558 to airworthiness and flight.

In retirement he was Chairman of the Air League.

Personal life and death
In 1967, he married Patricia Ann Davies; they had one son and two daughters. Knight enjoyed rugby and music in his spare time. He died on 28 November 2022, five days after his 90th birthday.

References

|-

|-

1932 births
2022 deaths
Knights Commander of the Order of the Bath
People from Leek, Staffordshire
Recipients of the Air Force Cross (United Kingdom)
Royal Air Force air marshals
Alumni of the University of Liverpool